Latitude (previously known as the "Ernst & Young Tower at Latitude") is a skyscraper in Sydney's CBD, part of the World Square complex bounded by George, Goulburn, Liverpool and Pitt Streets in Sydney, Australia.

Design and construction
The building comprises a low rise office, a retail complex incorporating a series of laneways and a high rise commercial tower. The 51 storey structure is 190 m in height and 222 m to the top of the spire. Its main tenant was Ernst & Young until 2017. The 51st floor is the headquarters for the Australian Health Practitioner Regulation Agency. The building also comprises the headquarters for Southern Cross Austereo, Hoyts, Reckitt Benckiser and Tabcorp Holdings.

The building was opened in January 2005. It was built by Multiplex.

The architect responsible for the design was Greg Crone, known for his work with King Street Wharf, Citigroup Centre and 400 George Street.

See also
 Skyscrapers in Sydney
 List of tallest buildings in Australia

References

External links
 Emporis.com

Skyscrapers in Sydney
Office buildings completed in 2004
Office buildings in Sydney
Skyscraper office buildings in Australia
Retail buildings in New South Wales
Sydney central business district